Plz or PLZ may refer to:

 Plz, "please" in texting shorthand
 Postleitzahl or PLZ, postal-code abbreviation in German-speaking countries
 PLZ, the old (1950–1994) ISO 4217 code for the Polish złoty
 PLZ, IATA airport code for Port Elizabeth Airport in Eastern Cape, South Africa
 plz, the ISO 639-3 code for the Paluan language
 PLZ, a London rap group that helped launch Reggie Rockstone's career
 PLZ, ICAO code for Planet Airways, an American airline 1995–2005

See also
 PLZ&W, an American short-line railroad